Dekle may refer to:

George R. Dekle Sr. (born 1948), an American lawyer
Hal P. Dekle (1917–2005), Justice of the Supreme Court of Florida
Dawn Dekle (fl. 2010s), president of the American University of Nigeria
Dekle Beach, Florida, a Gulf coastal community in the southern part of Taylor County, Florida

See also
Deckle, a removable wooden frame used in manual papermaking
Dekel, a moshav in southern Israel